Levoča District (okres Levoča) is a district in the Prešov Region of eastern Slovakia.

Until 1918, the district was part of Szepes County, a county of the Kingdom of Hungary.

Municipalities

References 

Districts of Slovakia
Spiš
Geography of Prešov Region